J. Emory Cross (January 26, 1914 – March 24, 2005) was an American judge and politician. He served as a Democratic member of the Florida House of Representatives.
He also served as a member for the 7th and 32nd district of the Florida Senate.

Life and career 
Cross was born in Iron City, Georgia.

In 1953, Cross was elected to the Florida House of Representatives, representing Alachua, Florida. Cross served until 1959. In the same year, he was elected to represent the 32nd district of the Florida Senate. In 1967, Cross left the 32nd district and represented the 7th district until 1968.

In 1973, Cross was elected to serve as a judge in the court of Alachua County, Florida until 1981. After that, he was a circuit court judge for the Supreme Court of Florida, serving until 1989.

Cross died in March 2005 in Tampa, Florida, at the age of 91. He was buried in Live Oak Cemetery.

References 

1914 births
2005 deaths
Democratic Party Florida state senators
Democratic Party members of the Florida House of Representatives
20th-century American politicians
Florida state court judges
20th-century American judges
People from Seminole County, Georgia
Circuit court judges in the United States
People from Alachua, Florida